Pierre Blacks (born 20 October 1948) is a Belgian archer. He competed in the men's individual event at the 1976 Summer Olympics.

References

External links
 

1948 births
Living people
Belgian male archers
Olympic archers of Belgium
Archers at the 1976 Summer Olympics
People from Ixelles
Sportspeople from Brussels
20th-century Belgian people